Josh Wood is an English professional rugby league footballer who plays as a  for Barrow Raiders in the RFL Championship.

He previously played for the Salford Red Devils in the Super League, and spent time on loan from Salford at the North Wales Crusaders in League 1, and Halifax and the Swinton Lions in the Championship.

Background
Wood was born in Wigan, Greater Manchester, England.

Career

Salford Red Devils
Wood made his Red Devils début in a Super League match on 22 May 2015 against the Warrington Wolves.

Barrow Raiders
On 11 Oct 2021 it was reported that he had signed for Barrow Raiders in the RFL Championship

References

External links
Salford Red Devils profile
SL profile

1995 births
Living people
Barrow Raiders players
English rugby league players
Halifax R.L.F.C. players
North Wales Crusaders players
Rugby league five-eighths
Rugby league halfbacks
Rugby league hookers
Rugby league players from Wigan
Salford Red Devils players
Swinton Lions players
Wakefield Trinity players